The Johannesburg Interbank Average Rate (JIBAR) is the money market rate, used in South Africa. It is calculated as the average interest rate at which banks buy and sell money. 

This rate is calculated daily by the South African Futures Exchange as the average prime lending rate quoted independently by a number of different banks. The rate is available in one-month, three-month, six-month and twelve-month discount terms. In particular, the three-month JIBAR rate is used as a benchmark of short-term interest rate movements.

The rate is calculated daily after all of the rates are received. It is  calculated as a yield and then converted into a discounted rate. The JIBAR rate is available daily from Thomson Reuters.

See also 
LIBOR
Prime rate
TED spread
LIBOR-OIS spread

References

Finance in South Africa
Reference rates